List of the monastic houses on the Isle of Man is a catalogue of abbeys, priories, friaries or other monastic house on the Isle of Man.

Abbreviations and Key

List

See also
List of abbeys and priories 
List of monastic houses in England
List of monastic houses in Scotland 
List of monastic houses in Wales 
List of abbeys and priories in Northern Ireland 
List of abbeys and priories in the Republic of Ireland 
List of monasteries dissolved by Henry VIII of England
Dissolution of the Monasteries
List of English cathedrals

Notes

References
 Cowan, Ian B. & Easson, David E. (1976) Medieval Religious Houses Scotland, With an Appendix on the Houses in the Isle of Man. Longman
 Map of Monastic Britain, South Sheet, Ordnance Survey, 2nd edition, 1954

Monastic houses
Abbeys and priories on the Isle of Man
Monastic|*